The 1987 Florida Citrus Bowl was held on January 1, 1987 at the Florida Citrus Bowl in Orlando, Florida.  The #10 Auburn Tigers defeated the USC Trojans by a score of 16–7.

The first score of the game came when the Trojans intercepted an Auburn pass and returned it 24 yards to take the lead. No other scoring took place in the first quarter, which ended 7–0. The second quarter saw Auburn retaliate, as the Tigers found the end zone twice (a 3-yard pass and a 4-yard run) to lead 14-7 at halftime. The third quarter saw no scoring and Auburn capped off the game with a safety in the fourth quarter, and the game ended 16-7.

Auburn finished the game with 9 more first downs, 156 more rushing yards, and 133 more total yards. However, the Trojans out-passed the Tigers by 23 yards.

References

Florida Citrus Bowl
Citrus Bowl (game)
Auburn Tigers football bowl games
USC Trojans football bowl games
Florida Citrus Bowl
Florida Citrus Bowl